Keith Wood (born 27 January 1972) is an Irish former international rugby union player who played as a hooker for Ireland, the British & Irish Lions, Garryowen, Harlequins and Munster. He was nicknamed 'The Raging Potato' because of his bald head, and as 'Uncle Fester' due to his resemblance to the character in The Addams Family. Wood is considered by many to have been the best hooker in rugby union during his era, winning the inaugural World Rugby Player of the Year award, and to be among the best hookers in the history of the game.

Early life
Wood was born in Killaloe, County Clare, and educated at St Munchin's College, Limerick.  His father, Gordon Wood, played prop 29 times for Ireland.

Club career
Wood started his career with Garryowen who he helped to All Ireland titles in 1992 and 1994 before moving to Harlequins. He returned to play with Munster in the 1999–2000 season and played in the European Rugby Cup final that Munster lost to Northampton Saints 9-8 in Twickenham Stadium before returning to Harlequins.

International career
Wood made his international debut in 1994 against Australia. He was capped 58 times for Ireland and five times for the Lions. Never the most accurate player in the set piece his real strength was in leadership and open play where he dominated the world XV's hooker spot.

He played on the 1997 and 2001 Lions tours, and was the inaugural winner of the IRB International Player of the Year award in 2001. He played a part in the Lions' 2-1 series victory over the Springboks in 1997. Wood captained Ireland.

He scored four tries in one game in the 1999 World Cup, in the pool stage against the USA. Ireland were later eliminated from the tournament when they lost to Argentina in the quarter-final play-off.

Wood retired from playing after the 2003 World Cup. He was succeeded as Ireland captain by Brian O'Driscoll.

Legacy
Wood was inducted into the International Rugby Hall of Fame in 2005, and to the IRB Hall of Fame in 2014.

Wood's total of 15 full international test tries was, at his international retirement, the record for a hooker, or indeed any player in the tight five. The previous record for international tries by hookers (or players at any position in the tight five) was 12, set by Sean Fitzpatrick of the New Zealand All Blacks. Wood's record has since been equalled for tight-five players by current USA front-rower Joe Taufete'e. Wood still holds the record for hookers, as Taufete'e to date has scored 14 tries as a hooker and one as a prop.

Media work
Wood has appearances on the BBC as a regular pundit and in The Daily Telegraph as a freelance journalist.

Personal life
Wood used to play hurling, and was a member of the Clare GAA side that played in the inaugural Nenagh Co-op hurling tournament in 1988. In 2018, Wood opened a café and restaurant on the main street in his native Killaloe with business partner Malcolm Bell, called Wood & Bell.

References

External links
St Munchin's College
Munster profile
IRFU profile
profile at lionsrugby.com

1972 births
Living people
British & Irish Lions rugby union players from Ireland
Clare inter-county hurlers
The Herald (Ireland) people
World Rugby Hall of Fame inductees
World Rugby Awards winners
World Rugby Players of the Year
Irish rugby union players
Ireland international rugby union players
Garryowen Football Club players
Harlequin F.C. players
Munster Rugby players
Rugby union players from County Clare
Rugby union hookers
People educated at St Munchin's College